Matěj Majober (1763-1812) was a Czech stage actor and playwright.

He is known to have been a member of the theater company of G. Jung in 1783-86. He was a leading member and part manager of the pioneer Czech language Vlastenské Theatre in Prague. He also produced several Czech language plays which were staged during his lifetime.

He was married to Zuzana Seve.

References 

 Starší divadlo v českých zemích do konce 18. století. Osobnosti a díla, ed. A. Jakubcová, Praha: Divadelní ústav – Academia 2007
 http://encyklopedie.idu.cz/index.php/Majober,_Mat%C4%9Bj

1763 births
1812 deaths
18th-century Bohemian male actors